Tabani (also Tabany, Tabanʼ, Taban') is a village in Briceni District, Moldova. It lies at an elevation of 254 m.

Notable people 
 Ion Ciocanu
 Valentin Tomuleţ

References

Villages of Briceni District
Khotinsky Uyezd